Monoxenus is a genus of longhorn beetles of the subfamily Lamiinae, containing the following species:

subgenus Bothynoscelis
 Monoxenus bicristatus Breuning, 1939
 Monoxenus bispinosus (Jordan, 1894)
 Monoxenus horridus (Hintz, 1911)
 Monoxenus lujae (Hintz, 1911)
 Monoxenus tridentatus (Aurivillius, 1903)

subgenus Dityloderus
 Monoxenus aethiopicus (Müller, 1941)
 Monoxenus balteatus (Aurivillius, 1903)
 Monoxenus balteoides Breuning, 1939
 Monoxenus bicarinatus Breuning, 1942
 Monoxenus bufoides (Jordan, 1894)
 Monoxenus declivis Hintz, 1911
 Monoxenus elevatus Aurivillius, 1926
 Monoxenus elongatus Breuning, 1939
 Monoxenus flavescens Breuning, 1939
 Monoxenus fuliginosus Gahan, 1898
 Monoxenus infraflavescens Breuning, 1949
 Monoxenus kenyensis Breuning, 1940
 Monoxenus mambojae Breuning, 1973
 Monoxenus multispinosus Breuning, 1939
 Monoxenus multituberculatus Breuning, 1942
 Monoxenus nigrofasciaticollis Breuning, 1967
 Monoxenus nigrovitticollis Breuning, 1956
 Monoxenus nodosoides Breuning, 1939
 Monoxenus nodosus (Hintz, 1916)
 Monoxenus ruandae Breuning, 1955
 Monoxenus spinosus Breuning, 1939
 Monoxenus strandi Breuning, 1939
 Monoxenus teocchii Breuning, 1970
 Monoxenus turrifer Aurivillius, 1914
 Monoxenus unispinosus Breuning, 1939
 Monoxenus werneri Teocchi & al., 2010

subgenus Monoxenus
 Monoxenus spinator Kolbe, 1893

References

 
Morimopsini